Huachón District is one of thirteen districts of the Pasco Province in the Pasco Region of Peru. Its seat is Huachón.

Geography 
The Waqurunchu mountain range traverses the district. Some of the highest mountains of the district are listed below:

References